"Rock" is a song by American rapper Plies. It is a promotional single from his mixtape Ain't No Mixtape Bih 3 (2017). The song was produced by 30 Roc and Cheeze Beatz. In early 2018, it became a viral sensation on the Internet and peaked at number 95 on the Billboard Hot 100.

Composition
The song finds Plies rapping about his love and appreciation for a woman loyal to him. It heavily samples "Late Night Tip" by Three 6 Mafia, nearly identical in instrumental.

Music video
A music video for the song was released on December 25, 2017 and directed by Omar The Director. In it, Plies roams the halls of luxurious mansion with his girlfriend. He gives her a piggyback ride, and goes bowling with her.

Charts

References

2017 songs
Plies (rapper) songs
Songs written by Plies (rapper)
Atlantic Records singles
Internet memes introduced in 2018